Canastota Junior-Senior High School is a secondary school located on Roberts Street in Canastota, New York, United States.

References

External links
 Official site

Public high schools in New York (state)
Schools in Madison County, New York